Ferdinand Lassalle is a 1918 German silent historical film directed by Rudolf Meinert. It portrays the life of Ferdinand Lassalle.

Cast
In alphabetical order
 Ernst Behmer
 Herr Braun as Otto von Bismarck  
 Arnold Czempin 
 Ernst Dohm 
 Hans Duncker 
 Herr Gross 
 Victor Janson 
 Anna Jordan 
 Erich Kaiser-Titz as Ferdinand Lassalle  
 Friedrich Kühne as Heinrich Heine  
 Herr Loewe as Arbeiter 
 Hanna Ralph as Gräfin Hatzfeld  
 Eugen Rex 
 Herr Richter 
 Herr Sand 
 Thea Sandten 
 Hermann Seldeneck 
 Bodo Serp as Hans von Bülow  
 Fritz Spira 
 Lu Synd 
 Ludwig Trautmann as Arbeiter  
 Herr van der Kelen 
 General von Pfuel 
 Gustav von Wangenheim as Janko von Rakowitza  
 Käthe Wittenberg

References

Bibliography
 J. Hoberman. Bridge of Light: Yiddish Film Between Two Worlds. UPNE, 2010.

External links

1918 films
Films of the Weimar Republic
Films directed by Rudolf Meinert
Films set in the 19th century
German historical films
German biographical films
1910s historical films
German silent feature films
German black-and-white films
Ferdinand Lassalle
1910s German films